The men's 1500 metres event at the 2011 Military World Games was held on 21 and 22 and 23 July at the Estádio Olímpico João Havelange.

Records
Prior to this competition, the existing world and CISM record were as follows:

Schedule

Medalists

Results

Round 1

Semifinals

Final

References

1500